Tivadar Puskás (born 16 August 1952) is a Hungarian physician, who served as the mayor of Szombathely since from 2010 to 2019. He was elected member of the National Assembly (MP) for Szombathely (Vas County Constituency I) in the 2010 parliamentary election. He was also MP from the Vas County Regional List of the Fidesz–Christian Democratic People's Party (KDNP) between 2006 and 2010.

References

1952 births
Living people
Hungarian physicians
Mayors of places in Hungary
Christian Democratic People's Party (Hungary) politicians
Members of the National Assembly of Hungary (2006–2010)
Members of the National Assembly of Hungary (2010–2014)
People from Veszprém